The Mithrodia is a genus of starfish in the family Mithrodiidae.

List of species 
 Mithrodia bradleyi Verrill, 1870 -- East Pacific
 Mithrodia clavigera (Lamarck, 1816) -- Circumtropical
 Mithrodia fisheri Holly, 1932 -- Hawaii.
 Mithrodia bailleui Perrier (MS) in Engel, John & Cherbonnier, 1948 (nomen nudum)
 Mithrodia victoriae—Former name of Mithrodia clavigera for the Atlantic Ocean.

References

Mithrodiidae